Julian Remo Perretta (born 13 January 1992) is an English singer-songwriter and producer. Perretta first gained attention in 2010 with the single "Wonder Why", released in the UK by Columbia Records. In 2016, Perretta released multiple solo hit singles, including "Miracle," which reached number one in 13 countries. Perretta has worked with such artists as Ed Sheeran, Ellie Goulding,  Dua Lipa, Rita Ora,  and Mark Ronson. 
Perretta has both written/ produced or featured on various global hit singles amassing over 1 billion streams.
In 2022, Perretta’s vocals were featured on the global number one hit single, “Miss You” for German producer Southstar. 
Selling 15 million records globally, Perretta has worked across many genres, notably Atlanta-based hip-hop artist Lil Baby.

Personal life
Perretta was born in London to an Italian father and an Irish mother, having one sister. Perretta left school at 15 to pursue a career in music. He developed a fan base while playing regular live sets at The Water Rats in Kings Cross and other pubs and bars around central London.

In 2006, Perretta met Ed Sheeran; the two subsequently became close friends and performed regularly together at various open mic nights around the UK. Perretta regularly guests on Sheeran’s live shows to date, and has recorded and written numerous songs together.

In May 2008, he joined Mark Ronson and Amy Winehouse on a European tour, and sang the Smiths' song, "Stop Me". In November 2009, Beyoncé invited Perretta to be special guest on her "I Am" Arena Tour. In July 2017, Beyoncé invited Perretta on the Formation Tour as her special guest.

Music career
Shortly after leaving school, he met the members of the band Jamiroquai and began working on demos. Two members from Jamiroquai—keyboardist Matt Johnson and guitarist Rob Harris—went on to produce Perretta's debut LP, and Universal Music Group signed him in 2010. Although a British artist, Perretta found greater success in continental Europe, notably France, Belgium, Switzerland, The Netherlands, and Germany. In January 2010, the debut single "Wonder Why" received its first play on national radio. BBC Radio 1 presented the single by host Annie Mac to a positive response by the public. In October 2010, Perretta performed on French television shows Le Grand Journal and Taratata.

"Wonder Why" received large radio airplay and charted within the top 5 on multiple iTunes charts around Europe, reaching platinum status. His debut album, Stitch Me Up, was released on 27 March 2011 and received positive reviews from critics. The album was certified platinum a year later, charting at number 1 in France and performing reasonably well in Germany, Denmark, Sweden and Holland.

In March 2011, Perretta toured Europe, playing a total of 104 shows.

In October 2011, Universal released a deluxe edition of the album Stitch Me Up as a Christmas re-edition. It contained 7 new tracks including acoustic versions and behind the scenes videos of the singer on tour. A promotional video for Perretta's single "Ride My Star" was released online on 19 October 2011. Perretta has also appeared on Ed Sheeran tours on various occasions throughout Europe in late 2012, playing some original material and covers.

In July 2014, electronic DJ's Dimitri Vegas & Like Mike announced the release of "Body Talk", a collaboration with Perretta, who wrote and featured on the single. The single debuted at number 1 on various iTunes charts as well as the top 10 on Beatport.

Perretta also collaborated with Los Angeles–based producer Zhu, most known for the single "Faded", which found fame.

Perretta released a single from his second album, Karma, on 13 November 2015, entitled "Miracle", a collaboration with Belgian producer Lost Frequencies. The song became Perretta's biggest solo hit to date, selling over 1.2 million copies and reaching number 1 in over 14 countries.

Discography

Studio albums

Singles

Featured in

Videography

Further reading

References

External links 
 Julian Perretta at myspace.com

1989 births
Living people
English male singer-songwriters
English pop singers
English expatriates in France
Singers from London
English people of Irish descent
English people of Italian descent
People educated at St Columba's College, St Albans
21st-century English singers
21st-century British male singers